Vasily Leontiyevich Kochubey (romanized: Vasyl Leontiiovych Kochubei) (c. 1640 – 15 July 1708) was a statesman of the Cossack Hetmanate of Crimean Tatar descent. His tenure was characterized by Pro-Moscow policies and was cut short by his execution on Hetman Ivan Mazepa's orders. Kochubey's great-grandson was the eminent Imperial Statesman Viktor Kochubey. The family name is also spelled Kotchoubey (French) and Kotschoubey (German, Almanach de Gotha).

Biography
 The grandson of the Crimean Tatar Kuchuk-bey, who left for Ukraine in the middle of XVII century and was baptized Andrey.
 Until 1675  he was a military chancellor of Hetmans I. Briukhovetskyi and P. Doroshenko
 1675   – P.Doroshenko'sEnvoy to Turkey.
 1676   – Envoy of Archbishop Lazar Baranovych to Moscow,
 1676 – 1681    – a military chancellor under I. Samoilovych.
 1681 – 1687   – he was a regent of the General Military Chancellery (1681 ) underI. Samoilovych, and also was in charge of hetman’s diplomatic relations with moscow tsars
 1687 – 1699    – Secretary General.
 1700 – 1708    – General Judge.

Denunciation of Ivan Mazepa and execution 
The first document accusing Hetman Ivan Mazepa  in betrayal and Hetman's negotiations with Poland  was submitted by V. Kochubeyto Moscow in August 1707  from Baturyn through Nykanor, the monk of the Sevskyi Savior Monastery, who was interrogated in PreobrazhenskyiPrykaz, but at that time the case was suspended.Then, on September 16, 1707 Nykanor reported on what he had heard from the Kochubeys topantler, Duke F. Romodanovskyi. However, Peter I have checked the materials of the oral denunciation only in December 1707 and even after that he did not take it into account and did not believe the denunciation

The next informer from the judge general was Petro Yatsenko (Yakovlev). In January 1708 , in Moscow he presented the main points of the denunciation to TsarevychOleksii, and accused Hetman Mazepa of having relations with Polish King Stanislaw Leszczynski and attempts to arrest Peter I. On 17 February 1708  the denunciation, written from the words of Kochubey and I. Iskra was sent to Moscow by Okhtyrka Colonel FedorOsypovwith the help of his clerk V. Kobeliatskyi.
On March 1, 1708  Peter I wrote about the crime of Kochubey and Iskra to his bedchamber count Golovkin and secret secretary Shafirov, who were investigating the denunciation materials by his order. Mazepa was asked to arrest the informers

On April 18, 1708 V.L.Kochubey and his relative Ivan Iskra, certain of their rightness, went to Vitebsk, where at that time was the Tsar's Campaign Chancellery. Upon arrival, they were arrested and tortured. All the details of interrogation of the suspects were thoroughly recorded in the materials of the investigation case. On 6 May1708 the arrested were sent from Vitebsk to Smolensk. Later, they were sent from Smolensk to Kyiv by ships along the Dnipro River.On 7 July 1708  they arrived to Kyiv-Pechersk Fortress
By order of I. Mazepa the informers were transported to the hetman's, camp, which was then located near the town of Borshchahivka. On July 14, 1708 Kochubey and Iskra were beheaded in the hetman’s convoy and buried in Borshchahivka. Later they were reburied on the territory of Kyiv-PecherskLavra near the Refectory Church where a memorial plaque was installed.

Family 
 Father: Leontii Andriiovych Kochubey.
 Mother: unknown.
Wife: Liubov Fedorivna Zhuchenko  – a daughter of Fedor Ivanovych Zhuchenko, Poltava Colonel.
 Sons:
 Vasyl Vasyliovych Kochubey (1680–1743)  – Poltava Colonel (1727–1743)
 Fedir Vasyliovych Kochubey (? – 1729)  – Bunchukovyi tovarysh.
 Daughters:
 Hanna Vasylivna Kochubey (?  – ?)  – wifeof Ivan Pavlovych Obydovskyi, Nizhyn Colonel (1676 – 1701), nephew of Hetman Ivan Mazepa. Two sons were born in their family.
 Mariia Vasylivna Kochubey (?  – ?)  – wife of Vasyl Stepanovych Zabila  - son of Nizhyn Colonel.
 Motrya Vasylivna Kochubey (1688 – 1736) - was the beloved of Hetman Ivan Mazepa, whom he wanted to marry but did not obtain her father's consent. Later - she became a wife of Semen Chuikevych (born in 1674 )  – Nizhyn regimental judge.
 Paraska Vasylivna Kochubey (?  -1726)  – wife of Bunchukovyi tovarysh FedirSulyma, brother of Semen Sulyma; 5 daughters were born in their family.

Memories 
After the transition of Ivan Mazepa to the side of the Swedes, Kochubey was celebrated as a martyr for the truth and a hero in the Russian Empire. A monument to VasylKochubey and Ivan Iskra  was erected in Kyiv in 1914, on the foundation of which a monument to the workers of the Arsenal plant has stood since 1923. The house, which belonged to Judge General VasylKochubey, has survived in Baturyn, Bakhmach district, Chernihiv oblast. It houses the museum of the National Historical and Cultural Reserve "Hetman's Capital".

References

1640 births
1708 deaths
Year of birth uncertain
Politicians of the Russian Empire
Chancellors General of the Cossack Hetmanate
Judges General of the Cossack Hetmanate
Zaporozhian Cossack nobility
Ukrainian people of Crimean Tatar descent
17th-century Ukrainian people
18th-century Ukrainian people
People executed by Russia by decapitation
18th-century executions by Russia
Burials at the Refectory Church, Kyiv Pechersk Lavra